First Commercial Bank may refer to:
First Commercial Bank (Chicago), a subsidiary of Metropolitan Bank Group headquartered in Chicago
First Commercial Bank (Birmingham), a subsidiary of Synovus headquartered in Birmingham, Alabama
First Commercial Bank (Odell, Nebraska), a National Register of Historic Places listing in Gage County, Nebraska
First Commercial Bank, a bank in Taiwan
First Commercial Bank of Florida, Orlando, Florida, U.S., a failed bank in the United States
First Commercial Bank, Bloomington, Minnesota, U.S., with Stu Voigt as chairman of the board
First Commercial Bank, New York, New York, U.S., a tenant in Two World Trade Center

See also 
First Bank (disambiguation)